Cody Glass (born April 1, 1999) is a Canadian professional ice hockey forward currently playing for the  Nashville Predators in the National Hockey League (NHL). Glass was the first-ever draft selection in Vegas Golden Knights franchise history, after he was drafted sixth overall in the 2017 NHL Entry Draft.

Early life
Glass was born on April 1, 1999, to father Jeff Glass, in Winnipeg, Manitoba, Canada. The parents divorced in 2010 and he lived with his father alongside his brother Matthew. Glass's grandmother Judy helped support the family financially until her death in 2016.

Playing career

Junior
Glass played AAA ice hockey with the Winnipeg Thrashers during the 2014–15 season, recording 55 points in 40 games. He was subsequently selected by the Portland Winterhawks of the Western Hockey League (WHL) in 1st round (19th overall) in the 2014 WHL Bantam Draft, after acquiring the pick in a trade with the Calgary Hitmen. In his rookie season, Glass was chosen to compete with Team Manitoba at the 2015 Canada Winter Games.

Early in the 2016–17 season, Glass quickly began rising in the draft rankings with his exceptional play. Initially rated a "C" level prospect by NHL Central Scouting in August, he was upgraded to "A" by November, indicating first-round potential. By the end of the season Glass was regarded as a top prospect of the 2017 NHL Entry Draft, with scouts praising his combination of playmaking, hockey sense and hands.

  
Glass was drafted sixth overall by the Vegas Golden Knights in the 2017 NHL Entry Draft. He is the first ever player drafted by the Golden Knights. On July 16, 2017, Glass agreed to a three-year, entry-level contract with the Vegas Golden Knights. Glass was invited to the Knights training camp before the 2017–18 season, however he was cut and reassigned to the Winterhawks before the final roster was announced. On March 31, Glass was named a Western Conference First Team All-Star and the Western Conference's Most Sportsmanlike Player. On April 17, 2018, Glass was assigned to the Knights' AHL affiliate, the Chicago Wolves, after the Winterhawks were eliminated from the 2018 WHL playoffs. However, The Wolves were eliminated from the 2018 Calder Cup playoffs before Glass made an appearance for the team.

On September 25, 2018, prior to the 2018–19 season, Glass was reassigned to the Winterhawks, where he was named team captain. While with the Winterhawks, Glass was one of seven WHL players selected by Team Canada to attend their 2019 National Junior Team Selection Camp. On March 20, Glass was named to the 2018–19 WHL First All-Star Team.

Professional
After attending the Golden Knights training camp, Glass made his NHL debut in the Golden Knights' season opener against San Jose on October 2, 2019. As a result, he became the first Golden Knights draft pick to play for the team. In that game, he recorded his first career NHL goal. During the 2019–20 season, Glass was elbowed by Rangers’ Brendan Lemieux who was fined $2,000 and he went through concussion protocol.

On July 17, 2021, Glass was traded to the Nashville Predators as part of a three-way trade; the team received Nolan Patrick in return; Patrick had been drafted second overall in the same 2017 Draft as Glass.

Player profile
Described as a quick-skating and mobile playmaker, Glass says he models his play after Patrice Bergeron of the Boston Bruins. Teammate Max Pacioretty said “He [Glass] has the ultimate hockey tool, and that's hockey IQ and knowing where to be on the ice.”

Career statistics

Regular season and playoffs

International

Awards and honours

References

External links 

1999 births
Living people
Canadian ice hockey centres
Chicago Wolves players
Henderson Silver Knights players
Milwaukee Admirals players
Nashville Predators players
National Hockey League first-round draft picks
Portland Winterhawks players
Ice hockey people from Winnipeg
Vegas Golden Knights draft picks
Vegas Golden Knights players